"Rockstar" (stylized in all lowercase) is a song by American rapper and singer Post Malone featuring Atlanta-based rapper 21 Savage. It was released on September 15, 2017, by Republic Records as the lead single from Malone's second studio album Beerbongs & Bentleys (2018). The artists wrote the song with producers Louis Bell and Tank God.

Despite receiving mixed reviews by music critics, the track became Malone's most successful hit single to date, reaching number one on the US Billboard Hot 100, and reached the top spot in several other countries, including Australia, Canada, Greece, Portugal, Romania, Ireland, New Zealand, Sweden, Norway, Finland, Denmark and the United Kingdom. It became both Post Malone and 21 Savage's first number-one single in all the countries mentioned. The song was nominated for Record of the Year and Best Rap/Sung Performance at the 61st Annual Grammy Awards.

Background
Post Malone posted a snippet of himself playing the track in the studio via Twitter on December 24, 2016.

Music videos
The unofficial YouTube video for the track's audio, released by Republic Records, is a three-minute-and-38-second loop of solely the song's chorus. Therefore, the song was able to receive equivalent downloads without featuring the entirety of the song, which some attributed to its number-one spot on the Hot 100. Some called it a "clever marketing scheme", while others believed it was a trick or a loophole.

The official music video, directed by Emil Nava, was released on Post Malone's Vevo YouTube channel on November 21, 2017. The video features Post Malone in a room fighting against a gang of men with samurai swords, and ends with Post Malone and 21 Savage covered in blood. Pitchfork noted that the video references the Japanese action film Lady Snowblood. On June 23, 2022 after nearly 5 years on YouTube, the video hit 1 billion views.

Commercial performance
The song reached number one on the US Billboard Hot 100, becoming Post Malone and 21 Savage's first number-one song. It debuted at number two behind Cardi B's "Bodak Yellow", breaking the single week streaming record on Apple Music with over 25 million streams becoming Post Malone's third top 20 hit, following his debut single, "White Iverson" and his top 10 hit "Congratulations". It stayed behind "Bodak Yellow" for three consecutive weeks before reaching the top spot in its fourth week. "Rockstar" topped the Hot 100 for eight weeks, the longest run at number one for a hip hop song in 2017. After its eighth week at number one, it was knocked off by "Perfect" by Ed Sheeran and Beyoncé. The single has sold over 10,000,000 copies, being certified Diamond in the US.

In New Zealand, it debuted at number 4, then moved to the top spot the following week, staying at the summit for 8 weeks. It prevented "Havana", from Camila Cabello reaching number 1, peaking at number 2 for 5 consecutive weeks. In Australia, it topped the ARIA Singles Chart for seven weeks In the United Kingdom, the song debuted at number five on September 22, 2017. The following week, it rose three places to number two, behind Sam Smith's "Too Good at Goodbyes", before reaching the top on October 6.

In September 2020, "Rockstar" became the second song ever, after Ed Sheeran's "Shape of You", to surpass 2 billion streams on the audio platform Spotify.

Critical reception
"Rockstar" received mixed reviews from music critics. Spin.com reviewed the song's unofficial video by stating: "The chorus loop may be a weirdly hypnotic, post-Vine marketing gimmick, but it seems like it worked. "rockstar" is both Post Malone's and 21 Savage's first-ever No. 1 single, meaning this probably won't be the last time an artist attempts to boost a track by distilling its catchiest section into a standalone product. Maybe, in the future, we'll all listen to seconds-long hooks on endless extended loops." Spin and Time both named the song one of the worst of 2017.

Remixes
On November 29, 2017, an unofficial Crankdat remix of the song was released on the Trap Nation channel on YouTube. On December 13, 2017, a Latin remix of the song featuring Dominican-Puerto Rican reggaeton artists Nicky Jam and Ozuna was released. Another remix was released on December 22, 2017, featuring new verses from rappers Jadakiss and Nino Man. On December 25, 2017, Lil Wayne released his remix of the song, titled "5 Star" and featuring Nicki Minaj, as a single from his mixtape Dedication 6. On January 23, 2018, American rapper Fetty Wap released his remix of the song.

Charts

Weekly charts

Year-end charts

Decade-end charts

All-time charts

Certifications

Release history

See also
 List of highest-certified singles in Australia
List of number-one singles of 2017 (Australia)
List of Canadian Hot 100 number-one singles of 2017
List of number-one hits of 2017 (Denmark)
List of number-one singles of 2017 (Finland)
List of number-one singles of 2017 (Ireland)
List of number-one singles from the 2010s (New Zealand)
List of number-one songs in Norway
List of number-one singles of the 2010s (Sweden)
List of Airplay 100 number ones
List of UK Singles Chart number ones of the 2010s
List of Billboard Hot 100 number ones of 2017

References

2017 singles
2017 songs
Post Malone songs
21 Savage songs
Republic Records singles
Billboard Hot 100 number-one singles
Canadian Hot 100 number-one singles
Number-one singles in Australia
Number-one singles in Austria
Number-one singles in Denmark
Number-one singles in Finland
Number-one singles in Greece
Irish Singles Chart number-one singles
Number-one singles in New Zealand
Number-one singles in Norway
Number-one singles in Portugal
Number-one singles in Romania
Number-one singles in Sweden
UK Singles Chart number-one singles
Songs written by Joey Badass
Songs written by Post Malone
Songs written by 21 Savage
Songs written by Louis Bell
Songs about drugs
Song recordings produced by Louis Bell
Cloud rap songs